Margaret is an English feminine given name, originally derived from Greek, via Latin and French forms.

Margaret may also refer to:

Arts, entertainment, and media
 Margaret (2011 film), an American drama film written and directed by Kenneth Lonergan
 Margaret (2009 film), a BBC television film about Margaret Thatcher
 Margaret (album), a concept album about American poet Margaret Rucker by Jason Webley
 Margaret (Dance 'Til Dawn), 1988 made-for-television movie directed by Paul Schneider
 Margaret (Little Britain), a character from the British television and radio sketch show Little Britain
 Margaret (magazine), a Japanese shōjo manga magazine
 Margaret (The West Wing), a character from the political drama series The West Wing
 "Margaret", a song from the album Whatevershebringswesing by Kevin Ayers
 Margaret, an 1845 novel by American author Sylvester Judd

Inhabited places
 Margaret, Alabama, United States
 Margaret, North Carolina, United States
 Margaret, Manitoba, Canada

Natural formations
 Margaret (moon), a moon of Uranus
 Margaret Creek, a stream and state waterway in Athens and Meigs counties of Ohio
 Margaret Island, Budapest, Hungary
 Margaret Island (Nunavut), Canada
 Margaret Lake (disambiguation)
 Margaret River (disambiguation)

People
 Lady Margaret (disambiguation)
 Margaret, Countess of Devon (disambiguation)
 Margaret, Marchioness of Namur (1194–1270), present-day Belgium
 Margaret, Countess of Blois (died 1230), France
 Margaret (the Lame) of Magdeburg (ca. 1210-1250), an anchoress of the St. Albans Church in Magdeburg, present-day Germany
 Margaret, Lady of Lisarea (fl. 1276), Greece
 Margaret, Countess of Tyrol (1318–1369), present-day Italy
 Margaret, Countess of Soissons (died 1350), France
 Margaret, Countess of Brienne (born 1365), France
 Margaret, Countess of Mar (died 1391), Scotland
 Margaret, Countess of Vertus (1406–1466), France
 Margaret, queen-dowager of Scotland (1489–1541), Queen of Scots by marriage to James IV of Scotland and regent for their son, James V of Scotland
 Margaret, Lady Moir (1864–1942), founding member of the Women's Engineering Society, Scotland
 Princess Margaret, Countess of Snowdon (1930-2002), Britain, sister of Queen Elizabeth II
 Margaret (singer) (born 1991), Polish singer and songwriter

Ships
 Scottish warship Margaret, built in 1505
 CGS Margaret, the first vessel to be built specifically for the Canadian Customs Preventive Service, 1914
 , an American maritime fur trade ship
 , an English ship wrecked in 1803
 , launched at Calcutta and sailed to England for the British East India Company
 , the name of several U.S. Navy ships

Other uses
 Margaret Bridge, Budapest, Hungary
 The Margaret, a historic apartment building in North Omaha, Nebraska, United States

See also
 Małgorzata, a Polish given name equivalent to Margaret
 Margret (disambiguation)
 Margareta (disambiguation)
 Margarethe, a feminine given name
 Margarita (disambiguation)
 Margarite, a calcium rich member of the mica group of the phyllosilicates
 Margherita (disambiguation)
 Marguerite (disambiguation)
 Saint Margaret (disambiguation)
 Santa Margherita (disambiguation)
 Santa Margarita (disambiguation)